The 1947–48 Norgesserien was the 4th completed season of top division football in Norway.

Due to restructuring of the league system, 58 of the 74 teams were relegated at the end of the season.

SK Freidig won the championship after a 2–1 win against IL Sparta in the championship final.

League tables

District I

District II, Group A

District II, Group B

District III

District IV, Group A

District IV, Group B

District V, Group A

District V, Group B

District VI

District VII

District VIII

Championship play-offs

Preliminary round

Quarter-finals

Semi-finals

Final

Relegation play-offs

Preliminary round

Group 1

Group 2

References
Norway – List of final tables (RSSSF)

Eliteserien seasons
Norway
1
1